is the southernmost ward of the city Sendai, in Miyagi Prefecture, Japan. ,  the ward had a population of 226,069 and a population density of 1470 persons per km2 in 102,728 households. Taihaku-ku is eleventh largest ward in Japan in terms of area, and second-largest in Sendai (behind Aoba-ku). The western portion of the ward is the former town of Akiu, Miyagi.

Geography
Taihaku-ku is located inland, forming the southern portion of Sendai metropolis. The area is mountainous to the west, and the Natori River flows through the ward.

Neighboring municipalities
Miyagi Prefecture
Aoba-ku, Sendai
Wakabayashi-ku, Sendai
Natori
Murata
Kawasaki
Yamagata Prefecture
Yamagata
Higashine

History
The area of present-day Taihaku-ku was part of ancient Mutsu Province, and has been settled since at least the Japanese Paleolithic period. The area was inhabited by the Emishi people, and came under the control of the Yamato dynasty during the late Nara period. During the Heian period, it was controlled by the Abe clan, followed by the Northern Fujiwara clan of Hiraizumi. During the Sengoku period, the area was dominated by various samurai clans before coming under the control of the Date clan during the Edo period, who ruled Sendai Domain under the Tokugawa shogunate. With the establishment of the post-Meiji restoration municipalities system, the area was organised into Natori District of Miyagi Prefecture. The expanding city of Sendai annexed the town of Nagamachi in 1928, villages of Nishitaga in 1932,  Tanaka in 1941, Oide in 1956 and town of Akiu in 1988. On April 1, 1989 when Sendai became a designated city by the national government with increased local autonomy, Taihaku-ku was formed as one of the five wards of the city.

Transportation

Railway
 East Japan Railway Company (JR East) - Tōhoku Main Line / Jōban Line
 -  -  
Sendai Subway - Nanboku Line
 –  –  – 
Sendai Subway - Tōzai Line

Highway
  – (Sendai-Minami Interchange)
  – (Yamada and Nagamachi interchanges)

Education

Colleges and universities
Tohoku University - Taihaku campus (Graduate School of Science)
Miyagi University - Taihaku campus
Tohoku Institute of Technology

Primary and secondary schools
Taihaku-ku has 28 public elementary schools and 14 public junior high schools operated by the city government. The ward has four public high schools operated by the Miyagi Prefectural Board of Education. Miyagi Prefecture also operates two special education schools within the ward. In addition, Taihaku-ku is host to the Tohoku Korean Primary and Junior High School, a North Korean international school.

Local attractions
Akiu Great Falls
Sendai City Tomizawa Site Museum
Sendai Yagiyama Zoological Park
Sendai City Wild Plants Garden

References

External links

 

Wards of Sendai